Balla may refer to:

Places 
Balla village in Tangail, Bangladesh
Balla, County Mayo, a small town in Ireland
Balla (Pieria), an ancient city in Macedonia
Balla village in Karnataka, India
Balla-Bassène, a settlement in Senegal
Balla-Djifalone, a settlement in Senegal
Balla-Djiring, a settlement in Senegal

Music 
Balla (musician), Portuguese record producer Armando Teixeira
Balla et ses Balladins, a dance-music orchestra from Guinea

People with first name Balla 
Balla Camara, Guinean economist and politician
Balla Fasséké, Sundiata Keita's griot
Balla Jabir (born 1985), Sudanese footballer
Balla Moussa Keïta (1934–2001), Malian actor and comedian
Balla Tounkara, musician and singer from Mali

People with last name Balla

In arts 
Giacomo Balla (1871–1958), Italian painter
Trace Balla, Australian children's writer and illustrator
Vivienne Balla (born 1986), Hungarian fine art and fashion photographer

In politics 
György Balla (born 1962), Hungarian politician
Mihály Balla (born 1965), Hungarian politician
Taulant Balla (born 1977), Albanian Socialist Party politician
Vital Balla, Congolese politician

In sport 
Ajit Singh Balla (born 1931), Indian high jumper
Ibrahim Balla (born 1990), Albanian-Australian boxer
József Balla (1955–2003), Hungarian wrestler
Mario Balla (1903–1964), Italian water polo player
Musaeb Abdulrahman Balla (born 1989), Sudanese-born Qatari middle-distance runner
Qamil Balla (born 1989), Albanian-Australian boxer
Thomas Balla (born 1936), American fencer
Virág Balla (born 1994), Hungarian sprint canoeist
Yassin Ben Balla (born 1996), French footballer

Others 
Mo Chua of Balla (died 637), founder of Balla, County Mayo
Valentine de Balla (1899–1957), Hungarian political scientist
Zoltán von Balla (1883–1945), Hungarian chess player

See also
Balla GAA, a sports club in Balla, County Mayo
Balla railway station, that serves Balla, County Mayo
Balla (Habiganj) railway station, Bangladesh
Ballas (disambiguation)